Brandon Richards may refer to:

 Brandon Richards (born 1967), an American track and field athlete
 Brandon Richards, former bass guitarist for Australian indie rock band Great Gable from 2015–2017

See also
 Richard Brandon (died 20 June 1649), an English executioner